France competed at the 1967 Mediterranean Games in Tunis, Tunisia.

Medalists

Gold
Pierre Toussaint (M) — Athletics, 800 metres
Sylviane Telliez (W) — Athletics, 100 metres
Bernard Vallée (M) — Fencing, Individual sabre
Jacques Ladègaillerie (M) — Fencing, Individual épée
Team (M) — Football (gold medal shared with Italy)
Marc-Kanyan Case, Michel Delafosse, Dario Grava, Gérard Hallet, Jean-Louis Hodoul, Daniel Horlaville,
Jean Lempereur, Gilbert Planté, Henri Ribul, Jacques Stamm, Michel Verhoeve, Freddy Zix
J. Muller (M) - Weightlifting, 67.5 kg
Rolf Maier (M) - Weightlifting, 75 kg
Marcel Paterni (M) - Weightlifting, 82.5 kg
Jean-Paul Fouletier (M) - Weightlifting, +90 kg
Daniel Robin (M) — Wrestling, Freestyle 78 kg  
Raymond Blaud (M) — Wrestling, Freestyle Open Category
Daniel Robin (M) - Wrestling, Greco-Roman, 78 kg

Silver
Arnjolt Beer (M) — Athletics, Shot put
Christian Noël (M) — Fencing, Individual foil
Jean-Pierre Meurat (M) — Weightlifting, 56 kg
J. Dumas (M) - Weightlifting, 60 kg
Serges (M) — Wrestling, Greco-Roman 57 kg
Team (M) - Volleyball tournament

Bronze
Jean-Pierre Colusso (M) — Athletics, Pole vault
Pierre Rodocanachi (M) — Fencing, Individual foil
Alfred Steiner (M) - Weightlifting, 90 kg
Marcel Levasseur (M) — Wrestling, Freestyle 97 kg

Athletics

Basketball

Football

Swimming

References

External links
Official report of the 1963 Mediterranean Games (Total medal tally does not include medals for weightlifting)

Nations at the 1967 Mediterranean Games
1967
Mediterranean Games